This article comprises three sortable tables of major mountain peaks of the U.S. State of New Mexico.

The summit of a mountain or hill may be measured in three principal ways:
The topographic elevation of a summit measures the height of the summit above a geodetic sea level.  The first table below ranks the 30 highest major summits of New Mexico by elevation.
The topographic prominence of a summit is a measure of how high the summit rises above its surroundings.  The second table below ranks the 30 most prominent summits of New Mexico.
The topographic isolation (or radius of dominance) of a summit measures how far the summit lies from its nearest point of equal elevation.  The third table below ranks the 30 most isolated major summits of New Mexico.


Highest major summits

Of the highest major summits of New Mexico, Wheeler Peak exceeds  elevation, 11 peaks exceed , and 26 peaks exceed  elevation.

Most prominent summits

Most isolated major summits

Of the most isolated major summits of New Mexico, Sierra Blanca Peak exceeds  of topographic isolation and three peaks exceed  of topographic isolation.

Gallery

See also

List of mountain peaks of North America
List of mountain peaks of Greenland
List of mountain peaks of Canada
List of mountain peaks of the Rocky Mountains
List of mountain peaks of the United States
List of mountain peaks of Alaska
List of mountain peaks of Arizona
List of mountain peaks of California
List of mountain peaks of Colorado
List of mountain peaks of Hawaii
List of mountain peaks of Idaho
List of mountain peaks of Montana
List of mountain peaks of Nevada

List of mountains of New Mexico
List of mountain ranges of New Mexico
List of mountain peaks of Oregon
List of mountain peaks of Utah
List of mountain peaks of Washington (state)
List of mountain peaks of Wyoming
List of mountain peaks of México
List of mountain peaks of Central America
List of mountain peaks of the Caribbean
New Mexico
Geography of New Mexico
:Category:Mountains of New Mexico
commons:Category:Mountains of New Mexico
Physical geography
Topography
Topographic elevation
Topographic prominence
Topographic isolation

Notes

References

External links

United States Geological Survey (USGS)
Geographic Names Information System @ USGS
United States National Geodetic Survey (NGS)
Geodetic Glossary @ NGS
NGVD 29 to NAVD 88 online elevation converter @ NGS
Survey Marks and Datasheets @ NGS
Bivouac.com
Peakbagger.com
Peaklist.org
Peakware.com
Summitpost.org

 

New Mexico geography-related lists

New Mexico, List Of Mountain Peaks Of
New Mexico, List Of Mountain Peaks Of
New Mexico, List Of Mountain Peaks Of
New Mexico, List Of Mountain Peaks Of
New Mexico, List Of Mountain Peaks Of